{{DISPLAYTITLE:C19H20FN3}}
The molecular formula C19H20FN3 (molar mass: 309.38 g/mol, exact mass: 309.1641 u) may refer to:

 Fluperlapine, or fluoroperlapine
 Gevotroline (WY-47,384)

Molecular formulas